Pseudotetracha murchisona is a species of tiger beetle that was described by Edmond Jean-Baptiste Fleutiaux in 1896, and is native to Australia.

References

Beetles described in 1896
Endemic fauna of Australia
Beetles of Australia